Vlăduț Nicolae Marin (born 15 May 1995) is a Romanian footballer who plays as a left back for Fossano.

References

1995 births
Living people
Romanian footballers
Romanian expatriate footballers
Association football defenders
Serie C players
Serie D players
Belgian Third Division players
Manchester City F.C. players
Juventus F.C. players
A.S. Roma players
A.C.R. Messina players
Rimini F.C. 1912 players
A.C. Cuneo 1905 players
Sportspeople from Râmnicu Vâlcea
Expatriate footballers in Italy
Romanian expatriate sportspeople in Italy